William Henry Baynes (1833–1898) was a politician in Queensland, Australia. He was a Member of the Queensland Legislative Assembly.

Early life 
William Henry Baynes was born in 1833 in England. He married Sarah (née. Robinson) and they had three sons, Harry, George and Ernest. In 1859 Baynes moved from Hawthorne, Victoria, to Brisbane, Queensland.

Political career 
He represented the District of Burnett in the Legislative Assembly of Queensland, from 28 Nov 1878 to 1 Oct 1883.
In 1881 he introduced a Selectors Relief Bill, which failed to pass.

Career 

In 1859 Baynes joined Isaac and Hugh Moore on Barambah station in the Burnett district and on Condamine Plains on the Darling Downs. He was one of the pioneers of the meat-preserving industry and has seen the trade develop from its very beginning. He established a butchering business in South Brisbane in 1859 and expanded to wholesale trade. In 1880, with his brothers, Baynes established the Graziers Butchering Co. and the Graziers Meat Export Co. The companies were sold in 1885 to a new partnership of the three Baynes sons (Harry, George and Ernest) and George Hooper, who was replaced in 1888 by John V Francis. The firm undertook meat preserving in leased premises at Queensport and had nearly 30 suburban shops as well as a plant at Belmont for fellmongering, wool scouring and soap making. In 1894 they registered the Graziers Butchering and Meat Export Co. Ltd with power to take over the assets of the two older companies. Baynes sons were bankrupt for a time but were discharged in March 1898 and immediately registered a new firm, Baynes Bros. George left the firm in 1899 and Ernest in 1912. With a new partner John Stitt, Harry reorganised the firm in 1918 as Baynes Ltd.

Later life 
Baynes died of acute meningitis on 4 September 1898, aged 66 years, whilst on business in Batavia, where he had just secured arrangements with the Netherlands India Company.

His body was brought back to Brisbane on the steamer, Duke of Buckingham to be buried in South Brisbane Cemetery, Plot 8B, grave 20A.

References 

Members of the Queensland Legislative Assembly
1833 births
1898 deaths
People from Queensland
Burials in South Brisbane Cemetery
19th-century Australian politicians
British emigrants to Australia
British expatriates in the Dutch East Indies